Rony is a given name. Notable people with the name include:

Ronielson da Silva Barbosa, Brazilian footballer better known as Rony
Rony Ahonen (born 1987), Finnish ice hockey defenceman
Rony Bakale (born 1987), Olympic swimmer from the Republic of the Congo
Rony Barrak, percussionist, composer, pianist, and arranger
Rony Mariano Bezerra (born 1984), Brazilian mixed martial artist
Rony Brauman (born 1950), French physician
Rony V. Diaz, award-winning Filipino writer
Rony Fahed (born 1981), professional Lebanese basketball player
M. Rony Francois, former secretary of the Florida Department of Health
Rony García, Honduran football goalkeeper
Rony Gruber (born 1963), Israeli film director and screenwriter
Rony Hanselmann (born 1991), Liechtensteiner footballer
Rony Martias (born 1980), French professional road bicycle racer
Rony Morales (born 1978), Honduran football defender
Rony Oren (born 1953), Israeli animator, claymator and academic
Rony Padilla, Christian music singer, musician, composer, worship leader from Honduras
Rony Robinson (born 1940), writer, educationalist and BBC Radio Sheffield presenter
Rony Schneider, Israeli former professional association footballer
Rony Sefo (born 1972), New Zealander kickboxer and MMA fighter
Rony Seikaly (born 1965), retired Lebanese-born American professional basketball player
Rony Stanyforth (1892–1964), Army officer and English amateur first-class cricketer
Rony Talukdar, Bangladeshi cricketer
Rony Santos (1995), Cape Verdean footballer

See also
Ronny, given name
Roni (given name)
Roney, surname